The Giardino Botanico Mediterraneo (10 hectares) is a botanical garden located along the Adriatic Sea about 2 kilometers north of San Salvo, Province of Chieti, Abruzzo, Italy. It is open Monday through Friday in the warmer months; an admission fee is charged.

The garden was established in 2001 by the Municipality of San Salvo to recreate and conserve a strip of typical Adriatic sand dunes, and to preserve plant species at risk of extinction. It currently contains about 300 species. The total site occupies 25 hectares, of which 15 are within the sea itself.

See also 
 List of botanical gardens in Italy
 Orto Botanico del Mediterraneo (Livorno)

References 
 Giardino Botanico Mediterraneo (Italian)
 Le Dune di Vasto (Italian)
 Istituto Nazionale per la Forestazione Ambientale (Italian)
 Orti botanici e giardini dell'Abruzzo (Italian)

Botanical gardens in Italy
Gardens in Abruzzo